The Queen's Affair is a 1934 British musical film directed by Herbert Wilcox and starring Anna Neagle, Fernand Gravey, Muriel Aked and Edward Chapman. An Eastern European President falls in love with the Queen whom he had previously deposed. It was also released as Queen's Affair and Runaway Queen.

It was made at British and Dominion Elstree Studios. The film's sets were designed by the art director Lawrence P. Williams. Gowns were designed by	Doris Zinkeisen.

Plot
Poor New York shop girl Nadina (Anna Neagle) receives unexpected news of an inheritance, and learns she is next in line to be queen of an Eastern European country. On her arrival in Ruritania, a revolution is in progress, and only minutes before her coronation, Nadina is forced into exile. She flees to Paris with her nurse (Muriel Aked), and then travels on to Switzerland. There Nadina encounters the Ruritanian revolutionary leader Carl (Fernand Gravey), recuperating from the trials of revolution, and the couple unexpectedly fall in love. When the revolution collapses in Ruritania, they return and marry, thus forming a constitutional monarchy supported by all the people.

Cast
 Anna Neagle as Queen Nadina  
 Fernand Gravey as Carl  
 Muriel Aked as Marie Soubrekoff  
 Miles Malleson as The Chancellor  
 Gibb McLaughlin as General Korensky  
 Michael Hogan as The Leader 
 Stuart Robertson as Revolutionary  
 Hay Petrie as Revolutionary  
 Reginald Purdell as Soldier  
 Edward Chapman as Soldier  
 Clifford Heatherley as Diplomat  
 David Burns as Manager  
 Trefor Jones as Singer 
 Arthur Chesney 
 Dino Galvani 
 Herbert Langley 
 Helen Mardi 
 Tarva Penna

Critical reception
TV Guide wrote, "This average musical features a good star turn by Neagle, but the whole film looks awfully dated."

References

Bibliography
 Low, Rachael. Filmmaking in 1930s Britain. George Allen & Unwin, 1985.
 Wood, Linda. British Films, 1927-1939. British Film Institute, 1986.

External links 
 
 

1934 films
British musical films
1930s English-language films
1934 musical films
Operetta films
Films based on operettas
Films directed by Herbert Wilcox
Films set in Europe
British black-and-white films
British and Dominions Studios films
Films shot at Imperial Studios, Elstree
1930s British films